Temple of the Sun is a  elevation summit located in Capitol Reef National Park, in Wayne County of Utah, United States. Cathedral Valley was so named in 1945 by Charles Kelly, first superintendent of Capitol Reef National Monument, because the valley's sandstone monoliths reminded early explorers of ornate, Gothic cathedrals, with fluted walls, alcoves, and pinnacles. John C. Frémont's 1853 expedition passed through Cathedral Valley.

Geology
Temple of the Sun is composed of unfractured, buff-pink Entrada Sandstone. The sandstone, which was originally deposited as sandy mud on a tidal flat, is believed to have formed about 160 million years ago during the Jurassic period as a giant sand sea, the largest in Earth's history. Strata in Cathedral Valley have a gentle inclination of three to five degrees to the east, and appear nearly horizontal. Long after these sedimentary rocks were deposited, the Colorado Plateau was uplifted relatively evenly, keeping the layers roughly horizontal, but Capitol Reef is an exception because of the Waterpocket Fold, a classic monocline, which formed between 50 and 70 million years ago during the Laramide Orogeny.

Gallery

Climate
Spring and fall are the most favorable seasons to visit Temple of the Sun. According to the Köppen climate classification system, it is located in a Cold semi-arid climate zone, which is defined by the coldest month having an average mean temperature below , and at least 50% of the total annual precipitation being received during the spring and summer.

See also

 Colorado Plateau
 Geology of the Capitol Reef area

References

External links

 Capitol Reef National Park National Park Service
 Weather Forecast: National Weather Service
 Temple of the Sun: YouTube

Capitol Reef National Park
Landforms of Wayne County, Utah
Sandstone formations of the United States
Colorado Plateau
Buttes of Utah